Austrogomphus turneri, also known as Austrogomphus (Xerogomphus) turneri, is a species of dragonfly of the family Gomphidae, commonly known as the flame-tipped hunter. 
It inhabits both rapid and slow streams and pools across northern Australia.

Austrogomphus turneri is a medium-sized, black and yellow dragonfly with a red tip to its tail.

Gallery

See also
 List of Odonata species of Australia

References

Gomphidae
Odonata of Australia
Insects of Australia
Endemic fauna of Australia
Taxa named by René Martin
Insects described in 1901
Taxobox binomials not recognized by IUCN